Utricularia bracteata is a medium-sized, probably perennial carnivorous plant that belongs to the genus Utricularia. U. bracteata is endemic to southern tropical Africa, where it has only been found at the type location in Angola, two other collections also in Angola, a collection in northern Zambia, and another from the Democratic Republic of the Congo. It was originally described and published by Ronald D'Oyley Good in 1924.

See also 
 List of Utricularia species

References 

Carnivorous plants of Africa
Flora of Angola
Flora of the Democratic Republic of the Congo
Flora of Zambia
bracteata